Golmakan Rural District is a rural district (dehestan) in Golbajar District, Chenaran County, Razavi Khorasan Province, Iran. At the 2006 census, its population was 22,816, in 5,960 families.  The rural district has 31 villages.

Notable people
Houshang Golmakani, author, film critic.

References 

Rural Districts of Razavi Khorasan Province
Chenaran County